Domenico Maselli (24 December 1933 – 4 March 2016) was an Italian politician and pastor.

Biography 
Maselli was born in Alessandria.  He was President of the Federation of Evangelical Churches in Italy. He was a member of the Waldensian Evangelical Church and a pastor in Lucca.

Politics 
A long-time member of the Italian Socialist Party (PSI), he later joined the Social Christians and the Democrats of the Left. He was a deputy from 1996 to 2001.

References 

1933 births
2016 deaths
People from Alessandria
20th-century Italian Roman Catholic priests
Italian Waldensians
Italian Socialist Party politicians
Democratic Party of the Left politicians
Democrats of the Left politicians
Deputies of Legislature XII of Italy
Deputies of Legislature XIII of Italy
Politicians of Piedmont
Calvinist and Reformed Christian socialists
Italian Christian socialists